Matthew Alan Johnson (born 18 November 1982) is a Welsh broadcaster and mental health activist from Caerphilly and is best known for presenting in the interactive "Hub" on ITV's This Morning between 2010 and 2013 and for co-hosting Channel 5's OK! TV. Matthew is a mental health campaigner, ambassador, advocate and is founder/creator of The Check-in.Co https://thecheckin.co/ 

He has also presented The National Lottery Draws and has been a presenter for Surprise Surprise.

Career

Television
Johnson joined ITV Wales in January 2009 presenting The Wales Show until December 2010.

In September 2010, Johnson joined the interactive "Hub" team on ITV's This Morning programme. On 3 June and 28 October 2011, he guest co-presented the main This Morning show on ITV. Johnson left This Morning in 2013 and presented his final show on 30 August.

From 14 February to 16 August 2011 Johnson was co-presenter of Channel 5's OK! TV.  In 2012, Johnson appeared as a celebrity contestant on the Christmas edition of Take Me Out. In August 2013, he was a contestant on an episode of Tipping Point: Lucky Stars He appeared as a contestant on a celebrity episode of The Chase in December 2014.

Johnson occasionally presented The National Lottery Draws on BBC One. He also co-presented Hwb, a programme for Welsh learners, on Welsh-language channel S4C. In 2015, he became a reporter for the ITV series Surprise Surprise. In October 2016, Johnson took part in Celebrity Haunted Hotel Live, presented by Christine Bleakley.

In 2013, Johnson was a contestant on the ITV series Your Face Sounds Familiar, performing as different singers each week. Johnson finished as one of the runners-up to winner Natalie Anderson.

Acting
In 2007, Johnson appeared on an episode of Gavin & Stacey playing Jose, Stacey's brother Jason's boyfriend.

Awards
In 2015 Johnson was in the top 50 most in-demand charity ambassadors in the world.

Personal life
Johnson is an ambassador for the mental health charity Mind. In May 2017 he presented Matt Johnson: Iselder a Fi (Depression and Me) on S4C, a Welsh-language personal documentary about issues of mental health, especially among young men, including his own story of struggling with depression.

He is an ambassador for the RSPCA animal charity and is creator of the Mental health Check-in.co method.

He starred in an episode of celebrity dinner date on boxing day 2022.

Filmography
Wales Tonight (2009–10) – Reporter
The Wales Show (–2010) – Presenter
This Morning (2010–13) – Hub presenter & stand-in main presenter 
OK! TV (2011) – Presenter
The National Lottery Draws (2012–2013) – Presenter
Take Me Out: Celebrity Special (2012) – Contestant 
Tipping Point: Lucky Stars (2013) – Contestant 
Your Face Sounds Familiar (2013) – Contestant
The Chase: Celebrity Special (2014) – Contestant
Hwb – Presenter 
Surprise Surprise (2015) – Reporter
Celebrity Haunted Hotel Live (2016) – Contestant

References

External links

Matt Johnson's blog - ITV Wales (2010)

Living people
1982 births
People from Caerphilly
British television presenters
Welsh television presenters
Welsh people of English descent